Geoffrey Richard Brokenshire (15 July 1922 – 28 April 1986) was an Australian rules footballer in the Victorian Football League (VFL). The Brokenshire family is of Cornish descent.

Personal life
Brokenshire served as a flight lieutenant in the Royal Australian Air Force during the Second World War.

External links

References

  at Blueseum

Carlton Football Club players
Collingwood Football Club players
Sandringham Football Club players
Australian rules footballers from Melbourne
Australian people of Cornish descent
1922 births
1986 deaths
Royal Australian Air Force personnel of World War II
Royal Australian Air Force officers
Military personnel from Melbourne
People from Brighton, Victoria